Kazemabad-e Panjshanbeh (also Romanized as Kāz̧emābād-e Panjshanbeh and Kāz̧emābād-e Panj Shanbeh; also known as Kāz̧emābād) is a village in Tabadkan Rural District, in the Central District of Mashhad County, Razavi Khorasan Province, Iran. At the 2006 census, its population was 1,081, in 260 families.

References 

Populated places in Mashhad County